is a former Japanese football player.

Playing career
Keisuke Kurouji played for J3 League club; YSCC Yokohama from 2014 to 2015.

References

External links

1991 births
Living people
Fukuoka University alumni
Association football people from Chiba Prefecture
Japanese footballers
J3 League players
YSCC Yokohama players
Association football midfielders